Magnifico is a term for a powerful man, especially in the historical Republic of Venice. It may refer to the following:
Lorenzo de' Medici (1449 – 1492) known as Lorenzo the Magnificent (Lorenzo il Magnifico) 
Walter Magnifico (born 1961), Italian basketball player
Magnifico (musician) (born Robert Pešut in 1965), Slovenian singer
Magnifico (film), a film from the Philippines that won the Jury Prize at the Berlin International Film Festival
"Magnifico" (song), a song recorded by Italian rapper Fedez, featuring vocals from Francesca Michielin
Magnifico, an alias used by the Mule (Foundation), a major character in Isaac Asimov's Foundation series of novels
Mr. Magnifico, a character in the animated television show Kim Possible
Juandissimo Magnifico, a character in the animated television show The Fairly OddParents

See also
 "Bohemian Rhapsody", a 1975 song by Queen